Martina Wagner-Egelhaaf (born 1957) is a Professor of German Literature at the University of Münster, Germany, and holds a chair in German Literary History with special focus on Modernity and Contemporary Literature. Her fields of research include Autobiography/Autofiction, Literary Theory, Rhetoric, Literary and Cultural Studies, Gender Studies, the relation of Religion, Politics and Literature as well as Law and Literature.

Life 
Martina Wagner-Egelhaaf studied from 1976 to 1987 Germanics and History at the Eberhards-Karl-Universität Tübingen, Germany. In 1987 she obtained her doctorate degree (Dr. phil.) from Tübingen University with a dissertation on Mysticism and Modernity (title: Mystik der Moderne). From 1987 to 1994, Martina Wagner-Egelhaaf was a Postdoctoral Researcher in the Department of „Literary Studies“ at the University of Konstanz. As a member of the team of Professor v. Graevenitz, she completed her habilitation in 1994 with a study on the Melancholy of Literature (title: Die Melancholie der Literatur).

From 1995 until 1998 she was Professor for New German Studies, especially for the Theory of Literature and Rhetoric, at the Ruhr-Universität Bochum. Since 1998 she is Professor for Modern German Literature at the University of Münster. She held Visiting Professorships at the University of Washington in Seattle, the University of Kansas, Lawrence, the Xi’an International Studies University, China, and at the National Mirzo-Ulugbek University in Tashkent, Uzbekistan.

Martina Wagner-Egelhaaf is Principal Investigator in the Cluster of Excellence „Religion and Politics, Dynamics of Tradition and Innovation“ and conducts a subproject in the CRC 1385 „Law and Literature“ at Münster University. From 2004 until 2010 she was a Senator for the German Research Foundation (DFG=Deutsche Forschungsgesellschaft) and from 2010 until 2019 she acted as a Member of the Selection Committee for the Allocation of Humboldt Research Fellowships of the Alexander von Humboldt-Foundation. Since 2020 she is Member of the DFG-Review Board 105 „Literary Studies“. In the year 2014 Martina Wagner-Egelhaaf was elected as Ordinary Member of the „North Rhine-Westfalian Academy of Sciences, Humanities, and the Arts“ (Nordrhein-Westfälische Akademie der Wissenschaft). Since 2018 she is Member of the University Council of Münster. Furthermore, since 2010 she is a Member of the IVG-International Board (IVG=Internationale Vereinigung für Germanistik/International Association for Germanic Studies).

Selected publications

Author 

 Sich entscheiden. Momente der Autobiographie bei Goethe. Göttingen: Wallstein 2020, .
 with Jürgen Petersen: Einführung in die neuere deutsche Literaturwissenschaft. Ein Arbeitsbuch. 8th ed. Berlin: Erich Schmidt 2009, .
 with Hendrik Blumentrath, Julia Bodenburg, Roger Hillmann: Transkulturalität. Türkisch-deutsche Konstellationen in Literatur und Film, Literaturwissenschaft Theorie & Beispiele. Münster: Aschendorff 2007, .
 Autobiographie. 2nd ed., Stuttgart/Weimar: Metzler 2005, .
 Die Melancholie der Literatur. Diskursgeschichte und Textfiguration. Stuttgart/Weimar: Metzler 1997, .
 Mystik der Moderne. Die visionäre Ästhetik der deutschen Literatur im 20. Jahrhundert. Stuttgart/Weimar: Metzler 1989, .

Editor and co-editor 

 Handbook of Autobiography/Autofiction, 3 vols., vol. 1: Theory and Concepts, vol. 2: History, vol. 3: Exemplary Texts. Berlin/Boston: de Gruyter 2019, .
 with Carla Dauven-van Knippenberg, Christian Moser, Rolf Parr: Text – Körper – Textkörper. Heidelberg: Synchron 2019, .
 with Bruno Quast, Helene Basu: Mythen und Narrative des Entscheidens. Göttingen: Vandenhoeck & Ruprecht 2019, .
 with Sonja Arnold u.a.: Sich selbst erzählen. Autobiographie – Autofiktion – Autorschaft. Kiel: Ludwig 2018, .
 with Wolfram Drews, Ulrich Pfister: Religion und Entscheiden. Historische und Kulturwissenschaftliche Perspektiven. Würzburg: Ergon 2018, .
 Stimmen aus dem Jenseits/Voices from Beyond. Ein interdisziplinäres Projekt/An Interdisciplinary Project. Würzburg: Ergon 2017.
 with Florian Kläger: Europa gibt es doch… Krisendiskurse im Blick der Literatur. München: Fink 2016, .
 with Christel Meier: Prophetie und Autorschaft. Charisma, Heilsversprechen und Gefährdung, Berlin: Akademie-Verl., 2014.
 with Christian Sieg: Autorschaften im Spannungsfeld von Religion und Politik. Würzburg: Ergon 2014, .
 with Sigrid G. Köhler, Hania Siebenpfeiffer: Materie. Grundlagentexte zur Theoriegeschichte. Berlin: Suhrkamp 2013, .
 Auto(r)fiktion. Literarische Verfahren der Selbstkonstruktion. Bielefeld: Aisthesis 2013, .
 with Katharina Grabbe, Sigrid G. Köhler: Das Imaginäre der Nation. Zur Persistenz einer politischen Kategorie in Literatur und Film. Bielefeld: transcript 2012, .
 with Franciszek Grucza, Claudia Liebrand, Hans-Gert Roloff: Autofiktion. Neue Verfahren literarischer Selbstdarstellung. Frankfurt a. M.: Lang 2012, .
 with Christel Meier: Autorschaft: Ikonen – Stile – Institutionen. Berlin: Akademie-Verl. 2011, .
 with Lily Tonger-Erk: Einspruch! Reden von Frauen. Stuttgart/Leipzig: Reclam 2011, .
 with Doerte Bischoff: Rhetorik und Gender (= Rhetorik. Ein Internationales Jahrbuch. Vol. 29). Berlin/Boston: de Gruyter 2010, .
 Hermanns Schlachten. Zur Literaturgeschichte eines nationalen Mythos. Bielefeld: Aisthesis 2008, .
 with Doerte Bischoff: Mitsprache, Rederecht, Stimmgewalt. Genderkritische Strategien und Transformationen der Rhetorik. Heidelberg: Winter 2006, .
 with Moritz Baßler, Bettina Gruber: Gespenster. Erscheinungen – Medien – Theorien. Würzburg: Königshausen & Neumann 2005, .
 with Sigrid G. Köhler, Jan Christian Metzler: Prima materia. Beiträge zur transdisziplinären Materialitätsdebatte. Königstein/Ts.: Helmer 2004, .
 with Doerte Bischoff: Weibliche Rede – Rhetorik der Weiblichkeit. Studien zum Verhältnis von Rhetorik und Geschlechterdifferenz. Freiburg i. Br.: Rombach 2003, .
 Region – Literatur – Kultur. Regionalliteraturforschung heute. Bielefeld: Aisthesis 2001, .
 Karl Philipp Moritz, Andreas Hartknopf. Eine Allegorie. Andreas Hartknopfs Predigerjahre. bibliographisch ergänzte Ausgabe. Stuttgart: Reclam 2001, .

References

External links 

 Literature by and on Martina Wagner-Egelhaaf in the Catalogue of the German National Library (Deutsche Nationalbibliothek) (https://portal.dnb.de/opac.htm?method=simpleSearch&query=115649824)
 Martina Wagner-Egelhaaf at the Germanics Department at the University of Münster (https://www.uni-muenster.de/Germanistik/Lehrende/neuere_deutsche_literatur/wagner-egelhaaf_martina/index.html)
 Martina Wagner-Egelhaaf at the Cluster of Excellence "Religion and Politics. Dynamics of Tradition und Innovation" (https://www.uni-muenster.de/Religion-und-Politik/personen/antragsteller/wagner-egelhaaf.shtml)
 Martina Wagner-Egelhaaf at the CRC 1385 "Law and Literature" (https://www.uni-muenster.de/SFB1385/)
 Martina Wagner-Egelhaaf at AcademiaNet (https://www.academia-net.org/profil/prof-dr-martina-wagner-egelhaaf/1134115), the datasource for renown scientists
 Martina Wagner-Egelhaaf at the North Rhine-Westfalian Academy of Scienes, Humanisties, and Arts (Nordrhein-Westfälische Akademie der Wissenschaften) (http://www.awk.nrw.de/akademie/klassen/geisteswissenschaften/ordentliche-mitglieder/wagner-egelhaaf-martina.html)
 Martina Wagner-Egelhaaf at the German Exchange Service (DAAD-Germanistenverzeichnis) (http://www.germanistenverzeichnis.phil.uni-erlangen.de/institutslisten/files/de/01000_de/1082_de.html)

1957 births
Living people
Academic staff of the University of Münster
German literature academics